Inape elegans is a species of moth of the family Tortricidae. It is found in Ecuador (Napo Province, Tungurahua Province and Morona-Santiago Province) and Peru.

References

External links

Moths described in 2006
Moths of South America
elegans
Taxa named by Józef Razowski